This is a list of the timelines for the history of northern New France beginning with the first exploration of North America by France through being part of the French colonial empire.

Beginnings to 1533 - northern region (present day Canada)
1534 to 1607 - northern region (Canada)
1608 to 1662 -  (Quebec region) 
1663 to 1759 -  (Quebec region)

See also

Acadia (New France) - northern region colony
Canada (New France) - northern region colony
Louisiana (New France) - southern region colony
French colonization of the Americas
French Colonial Empire

 
New France
-